The variable oriole (Icterus pyrrhopterus) is a species of bird in the family Icteridae. It was formerly considered to be conspecific with the epaulet oriole.

It is found in Argentina, Bolivia, Brazil, Paraguay, and Uruguay.

Its natural habitats are subtropical or tropical moist lowland forests, subtropical or tropical swamps, subtropical or tropical dry shrubland, and heavily degraded former forest.

References

variable oriole
variable oriole
Birds of Argentina
Birds of Bolivia
Birds of Brazil
Birds of Paraguay
Birds of Uruguay
variable oriole
Taxa named by Louis Jean Pierre Vieillot